The Hearts of Oak (originally "The Corsicans") were a volunteer militia based in the British colonial Province of New York and formed circa 1775 in New York City. The original name was evidently adopted in emulation of the enlightened Corsican Republic, headed by Pasquale Paoli, which had been suppressed six years before, and which got considerable sympathy in Britain and its colonies.

Militia members were primarily students at King's College (now Columbia University) such as Nicholas Fish, Robert Troup and, most famously, Alexander Hamilton.  The company drilled in the graveyard of nearby St. Paul's Chapel before classes in uniforms they designed themselves, consisting of short green tight-fitting jackets, a round leather hat with a cockade and the phrase "Liberty or Death" on the band, and a badge of red tin hearts on their jackets with the words "God and Our Right" (the motto Dieu et mon droit, translated into English and adapted to make its possessive pronoun plural).

In 1776 Hamilton was given a commission as a Captain by the revolutionary New York Provincial Congress with instructions to raise the New York Provincial Company of Artillery (today the Regular Army's 1st Battalion, 5th Field Artillery) and the mission to protect Manhattan Island. The Hearts of Oak formed its core.

In 2015, a supporters group for a Major League Soccer team, New York City FC, took up the name Hearts of Oak in tribute to Alexander Hamilton and his defenders of New York City. However the group's numbers severely dwindled in the following years, and it is unclear whether the group currently exists.

References

External links
Bibliography of the Continental Army in New York  compiled by the United States Army Center of Military History

Hearts of Oak (New York militia)
United States militia in the American Revolution
History of Columbia University
Columbia University student organizations